Wedgewood is an unincorporated community and census-designated place (CDP) in Wexford County in the U.S. state of Michigan. The population of the CDP was 227 at the 2020 census.  Wedgewood is located within Cherry Grove Township.

History
The community of Wedgewood was listed as a newly-organized census-designated place for the 2010 census, meaning it now has officially defined boundaries and population statistics for the first time.

Geography

Demographics

Education
Wedgewood is served entirely by Cadillac Area Public Schools to the northeast in the city of Cadillac.

References

Unincorporated communities in Wexford County, Michigan
Unincorporated communities in Michigan
Census-designated places in Wexford County, Michigan
Census-designated places in Michigan